S.Thimmapuram is a small village in Kirlampudi mandal in Kakinada district. The population of the village is approximately 2000.

References

Villages in Kirlampudi mandal